Sexo, pudor y lágrimas (Sex, Shame, and Tears) is a Mexican film, the second of the so-called New Era of the Cinema of Mexico (after Like Water for Chocolate) and the directorial debut of Antonio Serrano. The film won five Ariel Awards.

The film is based on Serrano's stage play of the same name, which ran for two years. The film broke box-office records in Mexico, grossing MX$118 million (roughly US$11 million). It played for six months, and was seen by more than eight million people in Mexico alone.

Plot
Tomás returns to Mexico after a seven-year trip around the world, to visit his friends Carlos and Ana, a couple going through relationship problems. Ana is seduced by Tomás, who is also her ex-boyfriend, which causes Carlos to kick Tomás out of their home. Although instead of Tomás leaving, Ana leaves and moves across the street to the apartment of their friends Miguel and Andrea, another couple going through problems. The situation becomes a battle of the sexes when Miguel is kicked-out for cheating on Andrea and sent to live with the "guys" across the street and María, their friend, joins the "girls" in a boycott against all men. Tomas then has a fling with Andrea and gets caught in the act. After seeing the emptiness of his life, punctuated with him making a scene at a local nightclub, Tomas declares his love for Ana before apparently committing suicide by walking into an elevator shaft.

Alternate endings
In the Region 4 DVD version, several alternate final scenes are explored, including Tomas surviving the fall and emerging in a full body cast.

Cast
 Demián Bichir as Tomás
 Susana Zabaleta as Ana
 Jorge Salinas as Miguel
 Cecilia Suárez as Andrea
 Víctor Huggo Martin as Carlos
 Mónica Dionne as María

Sequel
The sequel, Sexo, Pudor y Lágrimas 2 was released on February 4, 2022 on HBO Max. All the cast from the first film reprise their roles except for Demián Bichir, who appears in photographs and flashbacks.

Awards
 Silver Ariels from the Mexican Academy of Film:
 Best actress: (Susana Zabaleta)
 Art direction: (Brigitte Broch)
 Best original score
 Best original script
 Ambientación
Audience Award (XIV Guadalajara Film Festival)

References

External links

Review on the New York Times site
20 questions to Susana Zabaleta
 DVD review
 Profile on Zinema.com
 Sexo, pudor y lágrimas on the Mexican cinema site of ITESM

1999 plays
1999 films
1999 comedy films
Mexican comedy films
Mexican plays
1990s Spanish-language films
Estudios Churubusco films
1990s Mexican films